Anamera harmandi is a species of beetle in the family Cerambycidae. It was described by Maurice Pic in 1936. It is known from Laos and Thailand.

References

Lamiini
Beetles described in 1936